Q School 2018 – Event 3 was the third of three qualifying tournaments for the 2018–19 snooker season. It took place from 26 to 31 May 2018 at the Meadowside Leisure Center in Burton-upon-Trent, England.

Format 
The tournament consisted of players being randomly assigned to four sections. Each section plays in the knockout system with the winner of each section earning a two-year tour card to play on the main tour for the 2018–19 snooker season and 2019–20 snooker season. All matches were the best-of-7.

Main draw

Section 1 
Round 1

Section 2 
Round 1

Section 3 
Round 1

Section 4 
Round 1

Century breaks
Total: 22

 135, 103  Kuldesh Johal
 131  Mitchell Mann
 130  Fang Xiongman
 129  Brian Ochoiski
 122  James Silverwood
 121  Wang Zepeng
 121  Michael Collumb
 120  Farakh Ajaib
 115  Dylan Emery
 109  Greg Casey
 108  Andrew Pagett
 108  Wang Yuchen
 105, 101  Barry Pinches
 105  Ashley Carty
 102  Daniel Womersley
 101  Jamie Curtis-Barrett
 101  Leo Fernandez
 101  Long Zehuang
 100  Louis Heathcote
 100  Joel Walker

References 

Snooker competitions in England
Q School (snooker)
2018 in snooker
2018 in English sport
Sport in Burton upon Trent
May 2018 sports events in the United Kingdom